Byron George Harlan  (August 29, 1861 – September 11, 1936) was an American singer from Kansas, a comic minstrel singer and balladeer who often recorded with Arthur Collins. The two together were often billed as "Collins & Harlan".

Solo recordings
1899 
"Please, Mr. Conductor, Don't Put Me Off The Train" (remade 1903 on Edison Gold Moulded 7219) (w.m. J. Fred Helf)

1901
"Hello Central, Give Me Heaven"

1903
"Please Mother, Buy Me A Baby" (w.m. Will D. Cobb & Gus Edwards)
- on Victor & Edison
"Always In The Way" (w.m. Charles K. Harris)
- on Edison Records
"The Vacant Chair" (w. Henry S. Washburn m. George Frederick Root)
- on Edison
  
1904
'"Sweetest Girl in Dixie"
- on Leeds Talk-o-Phone

1905
"My Gal Sal"
"A Picnic For Two"
"Bright Eyes Goodbye"
"With the Robins I'll Return"
-on Edison Records
"Where Morning Glories Twine Around the Door" Oxford Disc Record #3282

1906
"Wait 'Till the Sun Shines, Nellie"
"Cheer Up Mary" - Edison Gold Moulded 9403
"When The Sunset Turns The Ocean's Blue To Gold - Columbia & United Talking Machine A439

1907
"And A Little Child Shall Lead Them" - Edison Gold Moulded 9472
"I'm Tying The Leaves So They Won't Come Down" - Edison Gold Moulded 9606
"School Days (When We Were A Couple of Kids)" - Victor 5086

1908
"Are You Sincere?" - Edison Gold Moulded 9973

1912 
"They Gotta Quit Kickin' My Dawg Aroun'" - Edison Standard Record 10559

1917
"With His Hands In His Pockets (And His Pockets In His Pants)" - Edison Blue Amberol 3124

1919
"Way Down East Where I Belong" - OKEH Record 1134-B

1921
"Down Where I Belong" - Pathe 20660

With Arthur Collins

1902
"They Were All Doing The Same" - Edison Gold Moulded 8255

1903
Meet Me Down At Luna Lena - Zon-O-Phone 194

1904
"Under The Anheuser Bush - Columbia 32409
"Down On The Brandywine" - Edison Gold Moulded 8712

1905
"In My Merry Oldsmobile" - Columbia 85016 (6" length cylinder - most were 5" length)
"Peter Piper" - 20th Century Talking Machine Record 85001
"Negro Recollections" (with Vess L. Ossman on banjo) - Edison Gold Moulded 7665

1906
"Afloat On A Five Dollar Note" - Edison Gold Moulded 9316
"Traveling" - Edison Gold Moulded 9287
"Camp Meeting Time" - Edison Gold Moulded 9415
"Take A Car" - Victor 4372

1907
"Come On And Kiss Yo' Baby" - Victor 16224-A
"Bake Dat Chicken Pie" - Victor 17221-B
"Arrah Wanna" - Edison Gold Moulded 9447
"Ev'ry Little Bit Added To What You've Got Makes Just A Little Bit More" - Edison Gold Moulded 9611

1908
"Cohan's Rag Babe - Columbia 33282

1909
"Down At The Huskin' Bee"
"Down Where the Big Bananas Grow" - Edison Amberol 308
"Make A Noise Like A Hoop And Roll Away" - Edison Standard 10122
"My Wife's Gone To The Country" - Columbia A724

1911
"The Barn Dance"
"Alexander's Ragtime Band"

1912
"I'm Goin' Back to Dixie"
"The Ragtime Soldier Man" - Victor and Columbia Records

1914
"The Aba Daba Honeymoon" - Edison Blue Amberol 2468

1915
"Alabama Jubilee"
"Kentucky Home"

1916
"The Kid Is Clever"

1918

"The Old Grey Mare"

1919

"On the Ozark Trail"

1922
"Ham & Eggs"

With Aileen Stanley

1913
"Tramp! Tramp! Tramp!" - Edison Amberol "Special H" and Edison Blue Amberol "Special H"

With Arthur Stanley

1909
"Marching Through Georgia" - Victor 16416-A

With Frank C. Stanley

1902
"All Aboard for Slumberville" - Edison Gold Moulded 8187

1904
"Blue Bell" - Edison Gold Moulded 8655

1904
"Dixie", or "I wish I was in Dixie" - Edison Gold Moulded 8784

1905
"You're My Heart's Desire, I Love You, Nellie Dean" - Edison Gold Moulded 9013

With Joseph Belmont
1903
"While the Birds are Singing to Me" - Edison Gold Moulded 9583

1904
"Robin and the Wren" - Edison Gold Moulded 8662

1905
"Beautiful Birds Sing On" - Edison Gold Moulded 9022

With Steve Porter

1913
"Two Jolly Sailors" - Edison Blue Amberol 1759

References

External links

 
 
 Byron Harlan cylinder recordings, from the Cylinder Audio Archive at the University of California, Santa Barbara Library.
 Byron G. Harlan recordings at the Discography of American Historical Recordings.

1861 births
1936 deaths
American male singers
Blackface minstrel performers
Pioneer recording artists